Ramnarace is a surname. Notable people with the surname include:

Randolph Ramnarace (born 1941), Guyanese cricketer
Sid Ramnarace (born 1973), Canadian designer